Kelabit may refer to:
 Kelabit people, an indigenous tribe in the interior of Sarawak, Malaysia
 Kelabit language, the language of the Kelabit people
 Kelabit Highlands, a mountain range in Sarawak, Malaysia
 Kelabitic languages also known as Apo Duat languages, spoken mainly by Lun Bawang, Kelabit people in Sarawak and Lundayeh in Sabah, Malaysia

Language and nationality disambiguation pages